Robert Lebel (born in Paris 11 January 5, 1901 and died February 28, 1986) was a art historian, specializing in modern French art. He was also an  essayist, poet, novelist, and art collector, He wrote  the first fundamental essay on Marcel Duchamp and remained close to the artists and poets of Surrealism. For example, Lebel was the friend and advisor of André Breton and close to Max Ernst, Jacques Lacan, André Masson and Claude Lévi-Strauss.

Biography 
Exiled to New York during the Second World War from 1940 to 1944, Lebel and his wife Nina lived in Greenwich Village on West 11th Street. There Lebel, father of Jean-Jacques Lebel, regularly met with Duchamp and the other artist intellectuals who had fled Europe for New York. With them, he discovered Native American art.

On his return to Paris, Lebel worked as an expert in classical paintings. In 1950, he launched, with Patrick Waldberg, the magazine "Encyclopedic Da Costa" that was published by Jean Aubier.

Published Works 
  Courbet. Tenth Anniversary Exhibition, New York, Marie Harriman Gallery, 1940
  The Fauvism , New York, Marie Harriman Gallery, 1941
  Mask with a blade , New York, Éditions Hémisphères, 1943
  Leonardo da Vinci or the end of humility , Paris, 1952
  First assessment of current art  (s / d Robert Lebel), The Black Sun - Positions n ° 3-4, 1953
  Blackmail of beauty. Small initial conference by André Breton, Paris, Editions de Beaune, coll. "The New Manifestos", 1955
  On Marcel Duchamp , with texts by Marcel Duchamp, André Breton and Henri-Pierre Roché, Paris and London, Éditions du Trianon, 1959.
  Géricault, his monumental ambitions and Italian inspiration , Paris, R. Legueltel, 1961
  Anthology of invented forms. Half a century of sculpture, Paris, Ed. of the Circle Gallery, 1962
  What is art criticism , suppl. to the magazine  Preuves , Paris, 1962
  The back of the painting. Morals and customs of the tableauistes , Monaco, Le Rocher, 1964 (only volume I has been published)
  Dorothea Tanning. Recent paintings, small gold sculptures , Paris, Le Point Cardinal, 1966
  Magritte. Paintings , Paris, Fernand Hazan, 1969
  Traite des passions par personne interposée , Paris, Eric Losfeld, coll. "The Mess", 1972
  Dada - Surrealism  with Patrick Waldberg & Michel Sanouillet, Paris, ed. Left Bank, 1981
  Marcel Duchamp , Paris, Belfond, 1985
  The Surreal Adventure Around André Breton  with José Pierre, Paris, Filipacchi, 1986

Fiction 
  The Double View  followed by  The Inventor of Free Time , cover illustrated by Alberto Giacometti, with the inset 'The Clock in Profile' by Marcel Duchamp, Paris, The Black Sun, 1964, repr. 1977
  L'Oiseau-caramel , cover illustrated by Max Ernst, with a lithograph of Erró, Paris, Le Soleil Noir, 1969
  Saint-Charlemagne , cover illustrated by Marx Ernst, Paris, The Black Sun, 1976

References

1901 births
1986 deaths
French art critics
French art historians
Cultural historians
French art curators
French male non-fiction writers
20th-century French male writers